Gabrielle Gonçalves Roncatto (born July 19, 1998 in São Paulo) is a Brazilian swimmer.

International career

2014–16

On September 3, 2014, participating in the José Finkel Trophy (short course competition) in Guaratinguetá, she broke the South American record in the 4x200-metre freestyle with a time of 7:58.54, along with Larissa Oliveira, Aline Rodrigues and Daniele de Jesus.

In April 2015, participating in the Maria Lenk Trophy in Rio de Janeiro, she broke the South American record in the 4 × 200 metre freestyle relay with a time of 8:03.22, along with Manuella Lyrio, Larissa Oliveira and Joanna Maranhão.

At the 2015 South American Swimming Youth Championships, held in Lima, Peru, Roncatto won a gold medal in the 100-metre freestyle.

Approaching her 17th birthday, Roncatto participated in the 2015 Pan American Games in Toronto, Ontario, Canada, where she won a silver medal in the 4 × 200 metre freestyle relay, by participating at heats. She also finished 10th in the 400 metre individual medley and 7th in the 200 metre individual medley.

2016 Summer Olympics

At the 2016 Summer Olympics, in the 4 × 200 metre freestyle relay, she broke the South American record with a time of 7:55.68, along with Manuella Lyrio, Jéssica Cavalheiro and Larissa Oliveira, finishing 11th.

2016–20

At the 2019 Pan American Games held in Lima, Peru, Roncatto won a bronze medal in the 4 × 200 metre freestyle relay. She also finished 13th in the 200 metre individual medley.

2020-2024
In May 2022, she broke the Brazilian record in the 400-metre freestyle with a time of 4:08.91.

At the 2022 FINA World Swimming Championships (25 m), in Melbourne, Australia, in the Women's 4 × 200 metre freestyle relay, she broke the South American record with a time of 7:48.42, along with Giovanna Diamante, Stephanie Balduccini and Aline Rodrigues. Brazil's relay finished 7th in the final.  She also finished 8th in the Women's 800 metre freestyle, 9th in the Women's 4 × 100 metre freestyle relay, 12th in the Women's 1500 metre freestyle. and 13th in the Women's 400 metre freestyle.

References

1998 births
Living people
Swimmers from São Paulo
Brazilian female freestyle swimmers
Brazilian female medley swimmers
Swimmers at the 2015 Pan American Games
Swimmers at the 2019 Pan American Games
Pan American Games silver medalists for Brazil
Swimmers at the 2016 Summer Olympics
Olympic swimmers of Brazil
Pan American Games medalists in swimming
South American Games gold medalists for Brazil
South American Games medalists in swimming
Competitors at the 2018 South American Games
Medalists at the 2015 Pan American Games
Medalists at the 2019 Pan American Games
Swimmers at the 2020 Summer Olympics
21st-century Brazilian women